Daniel Bogusz (born 21 September 1974) is a Polish former professional footballer who played as a defender.

Club career
Bogusz was born in Warsaw. He played several seasons in the Polish Ekstraklasa with Jagiellonia Białystok and Widzew Łódź.

International career
He also made two appearances for the Poland national football team.

Honours
Widzew Łódź
 Ekstraklasa: 1995–96, 1996–97
 Polish SuperCup: 1996

References

External links
 
 

Living people
1974 births
Footballers from Warsaw
Association football defenders
Polish footballers
Poland international footballers
Jagiellonia Białystok players
Widzew Łódź players
Arminia Bielefeld players
Sportfreunde Siegen players
Bundesliga players
2. Bundesliga players
Expatriate footballers in Germany